Muricopsis (Muricopsis) caribbaea is a species of sea snail, a marine gastropod mollusk in the family Muricidae, the murex snails or rock snails.

Description
The shell attains a length of 15 mm.

Distribution
This species is distributed in the Gulf of Mexico along Florida, in the Caribbean Sea along Mexico and Venezuela; in the Lesser Antilles

References

 Rosenberg, G., F. Moretzsohn, and E. F. García. 2009. Gastropoda (Mollusca) of the Gulf of Mexico, pp. 579–699 in Felder, D.L. and D.K. Camp (eds.), Gulf of Mexico–Origins, Waters, and Biota. Biodiversity. Texas A&M Press, College Station, Texas

External links
 

Muricopsis
Gastropods described in 1939